Around the World is the debut album by Ami Suzuki under label Avex Trax. Ami released a single by the same name on the same day.

Information
The album title was originally set to be Hopeful, but was later changed to the current one. The styles of the album consists of upbeat J-Pop songs with touches from house and trance, also with some sweet pop ballads and soft songs. A single of the same-title song was released the same of the album. It was included the previously released singles "Delightful", "Eventful" and "Negaigoto", and also the digital releases "Hopeful" and "For yourself". However, the Trance remix version of "Hopeful" was included in the album -the same as the one used in the promotional video and included in the Delightful maxi single- instead of the original J-Pop version. This versions hasn't been included in any physical release at the moment.

A curious fact is that the DVD of the album doesn't include the original music videos of the songs of the previous physical singles; the dance tracks videos are the original songs but only with the dance scenes that Ami shot for those videos, and the album edit of "Negaigoto" is a slightly different edit of the original video.

Sales
The album came in at #4 on its first day, but fell to #5 for the weekly charts. However, sales were lower than predicted. This record marked Ami Suzuki as a qualified and profitable female singer in the Japanese Music Industry.

Its first week AROUND THE WORLD sold approximately 30,000 copies. After various weeks in the charts, the album managed to sell more than 60,000 copies.

Track listing

Singles

Personnel
 Ami Suzuki - vocals, backing vocals
 Yumi Kawamura - backing vocals

Production
 Executive Producer - Max Matsuura
 Planner - Jun Harada
 Supervisors - Hiroshi "Funaty" Ishimori, Takashi Okuda
 Directors - Hatsukoshi Yasuhara, Aki Hori, Aya Noguchi
 A&R - Katsuhiko Sakurai, Shizuka Oruga, Hideaki Tamamuchi
 Desk A&R - Megumi Seyika, Nozomi Yasumune, Sakoto Sairenji
 Musical Director - Yoshihisa Tokuda
 Mixing - Naoki Yamada, Atsushi Hattori, Overhead Champion (#2), Axel Konard (#5)
 Recording - Kaoru Akimoto, Shuichi Watanabe, Masahiro Kawata, Atsushi Hattori, Kei Kusama
 2nd Engineering - Masahiro Kawata, Ryuichi Okubo, Hanae Saito, Hitomi Suzuki, Makoto Yamadoi, Hideaki Jinbu, Ryo Watanabe, Tsuyoshi Yamada.

Charts

References

Ami Suzuki albums
2005 albums
Avex Group albums